Oncotype (Denmark) is an interactive design group.

Oncotype is an interdisciplinary design group since 1998. The main thread in Oncotype's projects is interaction, both on print, websites and in interactive films. Oncotype received the Danish Design Award 2001 in the category Digital Communication, for its website.

External links
 

Danish design